Now Gidar (also Romanized as Now Gīdar, Naugidar, and Nūgdār and noogidar) is a village in Alqurat Rural District, in the Central District of Birjand County, South Khorasan Province, Iran. At the 2006 census, its population was 142, in 33 families.

References 

Populated places in Birjand County